Lamprigera is a poorly resolved genus of fireflies or glow-worms in the subfamily Lampyrinae, possibly placed in tribe Photinini. Species of the genus Lamprigera are found in Asia.

Species 
The Global Biodiversity Information Facility lists:
 Lamprigera angustior Fairmaire, 1886
 Lamprigera boyei Motschulsky, 1853
 Lamprigera crassus Gorham, 1880
 Lamprigera diffinis Walker, 1858
 Lamprigera lutosipennis Fairmaire, 1897
 Lamprigera marusii Pic, 1955
 Lamprigera minor E.Olivier, 1885
 Lamprigera morator (E.Olivier, 1891)
 Lamprigera nepalensis (Hope, 1831)
 Lamprigera nitens E.Olivier, 1885
 Lamprigera nitidicollis (Fairmaire, 1881)
 Lamprigera scutatus Fairmaire, 1897
 Lamprigera taimoshana Yiu, 2017
 Lamprigera tarda (Gorham, 1895)
 Lamprigera tenebrosa (Walker, 1858)
 Lamprigera yunnana (Fairmaire, 1897)

References

External links
 

Lampyridae genera
Beetles of Asia